Bilal Tizi Bouali (born 14 December 1997) is an Algerian professional footballer who plays as a defender for JS Bordj Ménaïel.

Honours

Club
JS Kabylie
 Algerian Ligue Professionnelle 1: Runner-up; 2018–19 
 Algerian Cup: Runner-up; 2017–18
 Algerian League Cup: 2021
 CAF Confederation Cup: Runner-up; 2021

References

External links
 
 

Living people
1997 births
Algerian footballers
Algerian Ligue Professionnelle 1 players
Algerian expatriate footballers
Expatriate footballers in Iraq
JS Kabylie players
WA Tlemcen players
Al-Mina'a SC players
Association football defenders
21st-century Algerian people